33 Thomas Street (formerly the AT&T Long Lines Building) is a  windowless skyscraper in Tribeca, Lower Manhattan, New York City, New York, United States. The building stands on the east side of Church Street, between Thomas Street and Worth Street. The building is an example of the Brutalist architectural style. It is a telephone exchange or wire center building which contained three major 4ESS switches used for interexchange (long distance) telephony, as well as a number of other switches used for competitive local exchange carrier services. However, it is not used for incumbent local exchange carrier services, and is not a central office. The CLLI code for this facility is NYCMNYBW. The building has also been described as the likely location of a National Security Agency (NSA) mass surveillance hub codenamed TITANPOINTE.

History
The location was previously the site of cast-iron buildings, typical of the area, the facades of which were preserved before demolition. The building was a core part of the AT&T Long Lines Department, housing solid-state switching equipment that required tight security and ample space. The Long Lines Department became AT&T Communications in 1984 after the Bell System divestiture. The AT&T Long Lines Building is now commonly known by its street address, 33 Thomas Street.

AT&T gradually moved switches and other facilities from their former AT&T Long Lines headquarters building at 32 Sixth Avenue, just a few blocks away, completing the move by 1999. 33 Thomas is still used for telephone switching, but some of the space is also used for highly secure datacenters.

On September 17, 1991, management failure, power equipment failure, and human error combined to disable AT&T's central office switch at 33 Thomas. More than 5 million calls were blocked, and Federal Aviation Administration private lines were also interrupted, disrupting air traffic control to 398 airports serving most of the northeastern United States. The problem arose when the electric utility, Consolidated Edison, asked AT&T to temporarily stop drawing electricity from the grid and instead use the building's on-site generators. The request was part of a previous load shedding agreement, and the switch had been performed successfully in the past, but on this occasion, it went wrong. After switching power sources, standard procedure was to check all the equipment power supplies, known as DC plants, for problems. But due to scheduled training, the check was not performed, and one plant went on battery backup. The alarms were not detected until it was too late to maintain uninterrupted power.

After the destruction of the World Trade Center in the September 11, 2001 attacks, AT&T Local Services restored lost facilities they acquired from the former Teleport Communications Group based there, to 33 Thomas and 811 10th Avenue.

Architecture
The Long Lines Building was designed by architect John Carl Warnecke and completed in 1974. The floors are also unusually strong, designed to carry  live loads.

The exterior walls have no windows (other than the entrance) and are made from precast concrete panels clad with flame-treated textured Swedish granite faces. There are six large protrusions from the rectangular base which house air ducts, stairs and elevators. There is a series of large, protruding ventilation openings on the 10th and 29th floors. William H. Whyte claimed that it features the tallest blank wall in the world.

It is often described as one of the most secure buildings in America, and was designed to be self-sufficient with its own gas and water supplies along with generation capabilities and protected from nuclear fallout for up to two weeks after a nuclear blast. Its style has been generally praised, with The New York Times saying it is a rare building of its type in Manhattan that "makes sense architecturally" and that it "blends into its surroundings more gracefully" than any other skyscraper nearby.

Use 

The building is a telephone exchange or wire center building which contained three major 4ESS switches used for interexchange (long distance) telephony, two owned by AT&T and one formerly owned by Verizon (decommissioned in 2009). It also contains a number of other switches used for competitive local exchange carrier services, but is not used for incumbent local exchange carrier services, and is not a central office. The CLLI code for this facility is NYCMNYBW.

33 Thomas was described as the likely location of a NSA mass surveillance hub codenamed TITANPOINTE, in an investigation by The Intercept, and in a documentary short film by Henrik Moltke and Laura Poitras titled Project X, both drawing on the surveillance disclosures of Edward Snowden. The investigation ties the facility to a nearby Federal Bureau of Investigation building, and its rooftop equipment to NSA's SKIDROWE satellite intelligence system.

In popular culture
 In the 1979 conspiracy satire film Winter Kills, 33 Thomas is depicted as the headquarters of a global surveillance operation run by John Cerruti, played by Anthony Perkins.
 Teju Cole refers to Long Lines in his first novel, Open City, about New York.
 Long Lines appears in season 3 of the TV show Mr. Robot as a bank records storage facility of E Corp.
 The building prominently appears in The X-Files episode "This".
 It is the building where Clive Owen, playing detective Sal Frieland, works in the 2018 Netflix movie Anon.
 The building has been cited as inspiration for the Oldest House, the setting of the video game Control by Remedy Entertainment.

See also
375 Pearl Street
Project Offices

References

External links

 Emporis listing

1974 establishments in New York City
AT&T buildings
Brutalist architecture in New York City
Buildings and structures completed in 1974
Skyscrapers in Manhattan
Telecommunications buildings in the United States
Telephone exchange buildings
Tribeca